Tim Seifert (born 14 December 1994) is a New Zealand international cricketer. He was part of New Zealand's squad for the 2014 ICC Under-19 Cricket World Cup, and made his international debut for the New Zealand cricket team in February 2018.

Domestic and T20 franchise career
In December 2017,  Seifert scored the fastest century in a domestic Twenty20 match in New Zealand, batting for Northern Districts against Auckland in the 2017–18 Super Smash. He made 100 runs off 40 deliveries.

He was the leading run-scorer in the 2017–18 Plunket Shield season for Northern Districts, with 703 runs in nine matches. In June 2018, he was awarded a contract with Northern Districts for the 2018–19 season.

In July 2020, he was named in the Trinbago Knight Riders squad for the 2020 Caribbean Premier League. In October 2020, he replaced the injured Ali Khan in the Kolkata Knight Riders team in the 2020 Indian Premier League (IPL), but did not play a match during the competition. Seifert was retained in the Kolkata squad for the following season's IPL but did not play before the suspension of the league in May during the COVID-19 pandemic. His departure from India was delayed after he tested positive for the virus.

In February 2022, he was bought by the Delhi Capitals in the auction for the 2022 Indian Premier League tournament. In July 2022, he was signed by the Dambulla Giants for the third edition of the Lanka Premier League.

International career
In February 2018, Seifert was added to New Zealand's Twenty20 International (T20I) squad for the 2017–18 Trans-Tasman Tri-Series, making his debut for New Zealand against England on 13 February 2018. In December 2018, he was named in New Zealand's One Day International (ODI) squad for their series against Sri Lanka, going on to make his ODI debut during the series in January 2019.

In August 2021, Seifert was named in New Zealand's squad for the 2021 ICC Men's T20 World Cup.

References

External links
 

1994 births
Living people
New Zealand cricketers
New Zealand One Day International cricketers
New Zealand Twenty20 International cricketers
Delhi Capitals cricketers
Kolkata Knight Riders cricketers
Northern Districts cricketers
Sussex cricketers
Cricketers from Whanganui
Wicket-keepers